Magnar Freimuth (born 20 March 1973) was an Estonian nordic combined skier who competed in the early 1990s. 

He finished 4th in the 3 x 10 km team event at the 1994 Winter Olympics in Lillehammer. He participated also on 1998 Winter Olympics in Nagano.

He was born in Tartu.

References

External links

Nordic combined skiers at the 1994 Winter Olympics
Nordic combined skiers at the 1998 Winter Olympics
Estonian male Nordic combined skiers
Living people
1973 births
Olympic Nordic combined skiers of Estonia